Francis Howell High School is a four-year public high school located in St. Charles, Missouri. Approximately 1800 students from Defiance, Foristell, New Melle, O'Fallon, Saint Peters, Saint Charles, Weldon Spring, and Wentzville attend school at Howell. It is in the Francis Howell School District. The school's mascot is Victor the Viking.

History
Founded by Francis Howell in 1881, by Lewis Howell. Francis Howell High School opened under the name of Howell Institute in Howell's Prairie. Originally, Francis Howell was a school where children could come to learn the basics of education and move up into high school.

After building up the school district, the district finally became Francis Howell School Consolidated District Number 2. On September 28, 1915, the Consolidated District Number 2 school board voted to name the new high school building "Francis Howell High School." On February 15, 1916, the new Francis Howell High School was dedicated.

The current Francis Howell High School is located between Highway 94 South and Highway D.  The property was originally purchased in 1949 from the United States of America under the jurisdiction of the War Assets Administration.  Army barracks buildings, which were located on the property, were used by the high school for several years following until they were later demolished in 1991.

Today, Francis Howell High School is a large suburban high school due to large population growth in southern St. Charles County. The original Francis Howell mascot was the "Dragoons", a horse riding soldier.  Since at least 1959, they have been known as the "Vikings".

Construction on a new academic building began in the summer of 2009 and was completed in 2011.  The new building features a new cafeteria, media center and classrooms.

Athletics

Football
The Vikings Football team won the Class 5 State Championship in 2022 with a 14-0 record. This is the first championship they have won.

Ice hockey
The Francis Howell Hockey Club participates in the Mid-States High School Club Hockey Association (MSCHA), which is governed by Missouri Hockey, Inc., and affiliated with USA Hockey, Inc.

Notable alumni
Sutton Smith, 2015: Professional football player for the Las Vegas Raiders
Calvin Munson, 2013: Professional football player for the Miami Dolphins
Brett Graves, 2011: Professional baseball pitcher
Nate Orf, 2008: Professional baseball designated hitter
Adam Long, 2004: Professional golfer
Patrick Schulte, 2019: Professional soccer goalkeeper for Columbus Crew SC 
Mark Parkinson, 1991: Former Missouri 105th (formerly known as 16th) district state representative
Joe Smith, 1991: Former Missouri 14th district state representative
Sammie Henson, 1989: 2x NCAA Wrestling Champion, 1998 World Champion, 2000 Olympic Freestyle Silver Medalist
Matt Dillahunty, 1987: President of the Atheist Community of Austin, TX
Jeff Hartwig, 1985: Pole Vault American Indoor Record Holder, 1996 and 2008 US Olympic teams
Dave Weckl, 1978: Jazz drummer

References

External links
Frances Howell High School

Educational institutions established in 1881
High schools in St. Charles County, Missouri
Public high schools in Missouri
1881 establishments in Missouri